The 2012 Uzbekistan Cup is the 20th season of the annual Uzbek football Cup competition. The Cup draw was held on January 25, 2012 in Tashkent.

The competition started on 23 March 2012 and ended on 30 November 2012 with the final at the Pakhtakor Markaziy Stadium in Tashkent. FC Pakhtakor are the defending champions.

The cup winner were guaranteed a place in the 2013 AFC Champions League.

Calendar

First round

Note:
 Chust-Pakhtakor and FC Pakhtakor-2 are awarded by 3-0 win over their opponents Lokomotiv BFK, Oqtepa Tashkent

Bracket

Round of 32

The one leg matches were played on 29–31 March.

|}

Round of 16
The sixteen winners from the Round of 32 were drawn into eight two-legged ties. 

|}

Quarter-final

|}

Semi-final

|}

Final

|}

References

Cup
Uzbekistan Cup
2012